Shademan Metro Station is a station on Tehran Metro Line 2 and Line 4. It is located in the junction of Azadi Street and Azarbayjan Street. It is between Navvab Metro Station and Sharif University Metro Station.
Its name was changed from Azadi Station to Shademan Station as it is located on Shademan Jct. on Azadi Street to avoid confusion with Meydan-e Azadi Metro Station located at the famous Azadi Square.

Features 

 Payphone
 Drinking fountain
 Two elevator(on both Azadi Street and Shadmehr Street)
 Praying room
 Escalator 
 Snack bar

References

Tehran Metro stations